Yu Man-gyun (born 3 April 1974) is a South Korean sledge hockey goalkeeper who used to be a wheelchair basketball player. During his career, he scored 2.66 goals and did .815 percentage of saves. In 2013, his save percentage was .894 despite the fact that his team lost 5–2 to Canada at the 2013 World Sledge Hockey Challenge. In 2012, he won silver medal at the 2012 IPC Ice Sledge Hockey World Championships which was hosted at Hamar, Norway. Yu was a member of South Korea's bronze medal winning team in para ice hockey at the 2018 Winter Paralympics.

References

External links 
 

1974 births
Living people
South Korean sledge hockey players
Paralympic sledge hockey players of South Korea
Paralympic bronze medalists for South Korea
Para ice hockey players at the 2018 Winter Paralympics
Para ice hockey players at the 2022 Winter Paralympics
Medalists at the 2018 Winter Paralympics
Place of birth missing (living people)
Paralympic medalists in sledge hockey